The 2010 Portimão Superleague Formula round was a Superleague Formula round  held on September 19, 2010, at the Autódromo Internacional do Algarve circuit, Portimão, Portugal. It was Superleague Formula's first visit to the circuit after visits in previous years to the country's Estoril circuit. It was the ninth round of the 2010 Superleague Formula season.

Eighteen clubs took part including Portuguese clubs F.C. Porto and Sporting CP.

Support races included the prestigious FIA GT1 World Championship as well as the FIA GT3 European Championship and GT4 European Cup.

Report

Qualifying

Race 1

Race 2

Super Final

Results

Qualifying
 In each group, the top four qualify for the quarter-finals.

Group A

Group B

Knockout stages

Grid

Race 1

Race 2

Super Final

Standings after the round

References

External links
 Official results from the Superleague Formula website

Portimao
Superleague Formula